Yellow Cargo is a 1936 American Poverty Row crime film written and directed by Crane Wilbur for Grand National Pictures. The film was rereleased in 1947 as Sinful Cargo. Starring Conrad Nagel as Alan O'Connor and producer George A. Hirliman's wife Eleanor Hunt as Bobbie Reynolds, it was the first of four G-man film series; the others were Navy Spy (1937), The Gold Racket (1937), and Bank Alarm (1937).

Plot summary
Alan O'Connor, a Federal Agent with the Federal Bureau of Narcotics is transferred to the Immigration and Naturalization Service by flying to California in a Boeing 247, His mission is to use his expertise to assist them with identifying how a dangerous gang is infiltrating Chinese illegal immigrants into the United States. He meets newspaper reporter Bobbie Reynolds and her comedy relief photographer Speedy "Bulb" Callahan who are trying to obtain an interview with the director and producer of Globe Productions, a motion picture company who has yet to make a film. As O'Connor has stage acting experience, he his goaded by Reynolds to get a role with Globe Productions.

The trio discover that the film company brings twenty film extras in Chinese theatrical makeup to one of the Channel Islands of California to shoot a film. Production is stopped, the extras are shipped back to the mainland by a different ship, the original boat brings back the same number of Chinese to the mainland.

Cast
Conrad Nagel as Alan O'Connor
Eleanor Hunt as Bobbie Reynolds
Vince Barnett as Speedy 'Bulb' Callahan
Jack La Rue as Al Perrelli
Claudia Dell as Fay Temple
Harry Strang as Joe Breeze - Bus Driver
John Ivans as District Commissioner Dietrich
Vance Carroll as Burke Darrell
Lillian Wessner as Nurse
Crane Wilbur as Montie Brace

Production
Production of Yellow Cargo began on December 2, 1935, at the Talisman Studios in East Los Angeles.

Reception
Variety wrote the film featured "a plot that has a certain amount of freshness and pretty good entertainment pull" with other reviewers acknowledging the film's innovative story and having solid production values for a low budget film.

Notes

External links

1936 films
American black-and-white films
1936 romantic drama films
Grand National Films films
American romantic drama films
1936 crime drama films
Films about illegal immigration to the United States
American crime drama films
1930s English-language films
1930s American films